Pietro Soddu (born June 19, 1929) was the President of Sardinia in 1972, again from 1976 to 1979, and finally in 1980. He served in the Chamber of Deputies for Legislature IX of Italy (1983–1987), Legislature X of Italy (1987–1992) and Legislature XI of Italy (1992–1994) as a member of Christian Democracy. He was later President of the Province of Sassari (1995–2000) as a member of the Italian People's Party.

References

1929 births
Living people
People from the Province of Sassari
Christian Democracy (Italy) politicians
Italian People's Party (1994) politicians
Deputies of Legislature IX of Italy
Deputies of Legislature X of Italy
Deputies of Legislature XI of Italy
Mayors of places in Sardinia
Presidents of Sardinia
Presidents of the Province of Sassari
Members of the Regional Council of Sardinia